Samuel Joseph Holland (born 20 February 1994) is an Australian professional baseball player for the Brisbane Bandits of the Australian Baseball League.

Career

San Diego Padres
On 28 November 2012 Holland signed a minor league deal with the San Diego Padres organization.

In 2013, he debuted for the AZL Padres of the Arizona League, impressing with a 2.25 ERA and 34 strikeouts in just 32 innings pitched.

In 2014, he was moved up to the short-season Eugene Emeralds, and again had a successful campaign, sporting a 2.43 ERA and striking out 53 batters and walking only 6 in 40.2 innings of work. 

In 2016, he was a member of the Lake Elsinore Storm and the Tri-City Dust Devils. He was released on 31 March 2016.

Los Angeles Angels
On 4 April 2016 Holland signed a minor league contract with the Los Angeles Angels organization. He elected free agency on 6 November 2017.

Mannheim Tornados
Holland signed with the Mannheim Tornados of the Baseball Bundesliga for the 2019 season.

Brisbane Bandits
Holland has pitched for his hometown Brisbane Bandits returning every year during the winter since the 2014-15 ABL season. In addition to his activity in the Australian Baseball League.

Australian National Team 
Holland has played for Team Australia at the U21 World Cup.

In 2017, he was a member of the Australia national baseball team in the 2017 World Baseball Classic.

In 2018, he was selected exhibition series against Japan.

In 2019, he was selected to Team Australia at the 2019 WBSC Premier12.

References

External links

1994 births
Living people
Australian expatriate baseball players in Germany
Australian expatriate baseball players in the United States
Baseball players from Brisbane
Baseball pitchers
Brisbane Bandits players
Burlington Bees players
Eugene Emeralds players
Lake Elsinore Storm players
2017 World Baseball Classic players
2023 World Baseball Classic players